The O'Day 22 is an American trailerable sailboat that was designed by C. Raymond Hunt & Associates as a cruiser and first built in 1972.

The O'Day 22 design was initially offered with a masthead sloop rig, but, after 1980, used a fractional rig.

Production
The design was built by O'Day Corp. in the United States from 1972 until 1983, but it is now out of production. It was one of the most successful boats produced by the company, with 3,159 built.

The design was replaced in the company's product line by the O'Day 222.

Design
The O'Day 22 is a recreational keelboat, built predominantly of fiberglass, with wood trim. Boats built from 1972 to 1980 have a masthead sloop rig, while boats built from 1981 to 1983 have 3/4 fractional sloop rig. The design's hull has a raked stem, a reverse transom, a transom-hung rudder controlled by a tiller and a fixed shoal draft fin keel or stub keel and centerboard.

A tall mast was also optional, with a mast about  higher.

The boat is normally fitted with a small  outboard motor for docking and maneuvering.

The design has sleeping accommodation for four people, with a double "V"-berth in the bow cabin and two straight settees in the main cabin, with a drop-leaf table. The head is located just aft of the bow cabin on the port side. The galley is located on the port side just aft of the head and is equipped with a two-burner stove and a sink. A hanging locker is opposite the head, on the starboard side.

Operational history
In a 2010 review Steve Henkel wrote, "You could buy an O’Day 22 in a number of configurations: Shoal keel (1' 11" draft) or centerboard ... masthead or 3/4 fractional rig; standard or tall rig; settee berths in the cabin or a dinette arrangement ... Small and not-so-small changes over the 11 years this boat was produced also add to the confusion; ballast was 600 pounds in early production, then went to 700, and finally became 800 pounds, strangely with no other changes to the overall weight of the vessel. Best features: O'Day produced the 22 with a nice exterior finish. Worst features: The rudder is immersed further than the keel on the keel-centerboard model, a no-no when the rudder is fixed in place as this one is, When the keel skims close to a rock but misses it, the rudder may hit and carry away. Also, the position of the mainsheet can interfere with control of the outboard motor, which is not within easy
reach of the helmsperson."

In a 2000 review in Practical Sailor, Darrell Nicholson wrote, "O’Day once set a standard for small boat construction and styling. That was before on and off labor problems in its plant, management changes under Bangor Punta, the decline in sales of boats in its size range, and increasingly fierce competition for buyers who became more cost than quality conscious. The later O'Day 22s were, frankly, a mixed bag of quality and shabbiness ... On a boat of this size and price, a minimum of exterior trim is understandable. What is less understandable is the poor quality of the interior finish and decor. Belowdecks the O'Day 22 epitomizes the pejorative label Clorox bottle, used to describe fiberglass boats. Sloppily fitted bits of teak trim are matched against teak-printed Formica, at best a tacky combination. Cabinetry, such as there is, is flimsy, and in general the whole impression is of lackluster attention to details."

See also
List of sailing boat types

References

Keelboats
1970s sailboat type designs
Sailing yachts
Trailer sailers
Sailboat type designs by C. Raymond Hunt Associates
Sailboat types built by O'Day Corp.